Aleksandr Sergeevich Senatorov (8 October 1912 – 24 January 1993) was a lieutenant-general in the Soviet Air Force.

Biography 
Born in the village of Vyshelej, Penza Oblast to a working-class family, he was a member of the Communist Party from 1938 onwards. Senatorov trained at the Penza Aviation School of the Civil Air Fleet. He entered the Soviet Army in 1930 and graduated from the Odessa Military Aviation School in 1932. 

He participated in the Spanish Civil War from 1936 to 1939, assisting the Republican government. As the commander of a detachment of a fast bomber squadron he bombed military targets deep in the rear of enemy lines. He personally led a group of bombers to the northern front, which landed without incident at a destroyed airfield. He completed 100 combat sorties. He was awarded the title Hero of the Soviet Union on 14 March 1938 and went on to graduate from the General Staff Academy's advanced course for command personnel in 1939.

Soon after returning to his homeland, he was appointed deputy commander of the Air Force of the Separate Red Banner Far Eastern Army and in September 1938, deputy commander of the Air Force of the 1st Separate Red Banner Army. In this position he participated in the Battle of Lake Khasan. In 1939 he graduated from the Advanced Training Courses for the Higher Commanding Staff (KUVNAS) at the Academy of the General Staff. Since June 1940 he was Air Force Commander in the 1st Red Banner Army.

During World War II he was a Major-General of Aviation and in the summer of 1942 he was appointed commander of the 9th Air Army of the Far Eastern Front. From September 1944, he was the deputy commander of the 16th Air Army, which, as part of the 1st Belorussian Front, fought against the Germans in the Vistula-Oder and Berlin offensive operations.

He graduated from the General Staff Academy in 1948 and retired in 1963 as a Lieutenant-General and lived in Moscow until his death.

Awards 

 Hero of the Soviet Union
 Two Orders of Lenin
 Two Order of the Red Banner
  Order of Bogdan Khmelnitsky 1st class
 Order of Suvorov 2nd class
 Order of the Patriotic War 1st class
 Two Order of the Red Star
 Order of the Badge of Honour
 campaign and jubilee medals

References  

1912 births
1993 deaths
Communist Party of the Soviet Union members
Heroes of the Soviet Union
Russian people of the Spanish Civil War
Soviet Air Force generals
Soviet lieutenant generals
Soviet World War II bomber pilots
Soviet people of the Spanish Civil War
Military Academy of the General Staff of the Armed Forces of the Soviet Union alumni
Recipients of the Order of Lenin
Recipients of the Order of the Red Banner
Recipients of the Order of Bogdan Khmelnitsky (Soviet Union), 1st class
Recipients of the Order of Suvorov, 2nd class